Frank Crudele is an Italian-Canadian actor. He was born and lived in Italy (Triggiano near Bari) until 10 yrs old. His family moved to Canada in Montreal in 1965 and two years later to Toronto where he spent his formative years. He has an older brother (Vince Crudele) and two sisters who married two brothers; Marie Lecce and Maria Teresa Lecce.
He holds a BA from Concordia University in Italian literature (1977). His main acting teacher and influence was Stella Adler in NYC with whom he studied on a Canada Council grant. Having worked extensively in theatre for the first decade, his career has spanned between Europe, Canada and the US and has worked in English, Italian, Spanish and French. He has played prominent roles in both film & television and was chosen and directed by Martin Scorsese to play “Big Jim Colosimo” in the 2009 pilot episode of the award winning HBO tv series Boardwalk Empire. His breakout appearance for his work in Europe was at the 2002 Venice film festival for “My Name is Tanino”, directed by Paolo Virzi’. In Italy he is popularly recognized as coast-guard marshall “Pietro Melluso” in the RAI tv series "Gente di Mare" and as the scoundrel-lover "Peppiniello" in "Un Medico in Famiglia". In Spain he was in the ensemble film “Cobardes”, winner of the critics award at the 2008 Malaga film festival. He has played “pope Alejandro vii” in the Spanish action film “Red Eagle” and was in two of Spain’s most popular tv series; “Velvet” and “Los Hombres De Paco”. Frank Crudele was married to Kathleen O’Hara with whom he had three children: Nico, Hanna and Gabriel. He divorced in 2010 and his former wife died from cancer in 2015. Since the passing of the mother of his children he has been based in Canada near Vancouver in Roberts Creek, BC with his Spanish partner Virginia Perez who he met in Madrid.

Cinema 

 La Famiglia Buonanotte, director Carlo Liconti (1989)  
 The Swordsman, director  Michael Kennedy (1992)  
 Vita da Cane, director Carlo Liconti (1992)  
 Boozecam, director Nicholas Campbell (1994)  
 Wounded, director Richard Martin, 1997  
 La Deroute, director Paul Tana (1998)  
 Boy Meets Girl, director Jerry Ciccoritti (1998)  
 Running Home, director Marc F. Voizard (1999)  
 The Life Before This, director Jerry Ciccoritti (1999)  
 Chasing Cain, director Jerry Ciccoritti (2001)  
 The Legend of Al, John and Jack, director Aldo, Giovanni & Giacomo and Massimo Venier (2002)  
 My Name is Tanino, director Paolo Virzì (2002)
 Il miracolo, director Edoardo Winspeare (2003) 
 Saint Ralph, director Michael McGowan (2004) 
 Cobardes, director Jose Corbacho and Juan Cruz (2008) 
 La vita è una cosa meravigliosa, director Carlo Vanzina (2010)
 Aguila Roja, director José Ramón Ayerra (2011)
 Missione di pace, director Francesco Lagi  (2011)
 Tutti i santi giorni, director Paolo Virzì (2012)
 Something Good, director Luca Barbareschi (2013)
 Step Up 5, director Trish Sie (2013)

TV series 
Maniac Mansion ( 1 episode, 1991)
Highlander (1 episode, 1993)
The Commish (1 episode, 1993)
Seasons of the Heart (1994) 
A Dream is a wish your heart makes: The Annette Funicello Story (1995)
Fighting for My Daughter (1995)
Gotti (1996)
Promise the Moon (1997)
The Don's Analyst (1997)
Trial and error (1997)
While My Pretty One Sleeps (1997) 
Blackjack (1998)
Due poliziotti a Chicago: (1 episode, 1998)
Giving Up the Ghost (1998)
Un medico in famiglia (1998)
Valentine's Day (1998)
Bonanno: A Godfather's Story (1999) 
Spenser: Small Vices (1999)
Vendetta (1999)
Relic Hunter (1 episode, 2000)
Come l'America (2001)
The Roman Spring of Misses Stone (2003)
Un posto tranquillo (2003)
Doc (1 episode, 2004)
Lives of the Saints (2004)
Gente di mare (2005)
Ho sposato un calciatore (2005)
Un posto tranquillo 2 (2005)
L'ispettore Coliandro (1 episode, 2006)
Fuga con Marlene (2007)
Gente di mare 2 (2007)
Boardwalk Empire (2 episodes, 2009)
Pane e libertà (2009)
Tutta la musica del cuore (2013)
Zero (2021)

References

Living people
1954 births
Italian male film actors
20th-century Italian male actors
21st-century Italian male actors
People from Bari
Italian male stage actors
Italian male television actors